William Whitney Christmas, M.D. (September 1, 1865 – April 14, 1960) was a physician, pioneer aviator, and supposed con man. He was one of many claimants for an early design of the aileron.  He was a vice-president of the General Development Corporation.

Biography
He was born on September 1, 1865 in Warrenton, North Carolina to James Yancey Christmas and Rhoda Gaines. He attended the St. John's Military Academy then the University of Virginia where he obtained a bachelor's degree and a master's degree. He graduated from George Washington University in 1905 with an M.D.

He married May Norris in 1899 in Maryland, and they had as their son, Whitney Norris Christmas.

He developed the Christmas Bullet airplane in 1918 which had sprung steel wing spars, which crashed on its maiden flight after the wings tore themselves from the fuselage, killing the pilot. He then built a second example which also crashed on its maiden flight, again killing the pilot.

In retirement he was still proposing improbable aeroplane designs.

He died at Bellevue Hospital in Manhattan, New York City of pneumonia on April 14, 1960.

Aircraft
Aircraft designed or developed by Christmas, most of which never left the drawing board, but were supposed to introduce various aviation patents. It is unlikely that any of them other than the Bullet ever flew.
(1910: (Dr William Whitney) Christmas Aeroplane Co, Washington DC. c.1912: Durham Christmas Aeroplane Sales & Exhibition Co. 1918: Cantilever Aero Co, Copiague, NY.)
 Christmas Red Bird 1909 biplane
 Christmas Red Bird II 1910 biplane
 Christmas 1912 pusher biplane
 Christmas 1913 tractor biplane
 Christmas 1915 biplane
 Christmas Aerial Express
 Christmas Bullet

Footnotes

External links
William Whitney Christmas at Early Birds of Aviation
William Whitney Christmas at Smithsonian Institution
William Whitney Christmas at The New York Times

George Washington University School of Medicine & Health Sciences alumni
Members of the Early Birds of Aviation
1865 births
1960 deaths
Deaths from pneumonia in New York City
American aviators
Physicians from Maryland